was a private junior college in the city of Ichihara in Chiba Prefecture, Japan. Established in 1990, the school was operated by Teikyo Group, a foundation that operates more than 30 schools (including colleges) across Japan. The college closed in 2016.

External links
 Official website 

Japanese junior colleges
Educational institutions established in 1990
Private universities and colleges in Japan
Universities and colleges in Chiba Prefecture
Nursing schools in Japan
1990 establishments in Japan